is an railway station in Suita, Osaka Prefecture, Japan, and operated by West Japan Railway Company (JR West). The station was opened on 16 March 2019.

Lines
Minami-Suita Station served by the Osaka Higashi Line, was completed on 16 March 2019.

Layout
The station has two side platforms, each capable of accommodating eight-car trains.

See also
 List of railway stations in Japan

References

External links
 Suita city information 
 Osaka Soto-kanjo Railway website 

Railway stations in Osaka Prefecture
Stations of West Japan Railway Company
Railway stations in Japan opened in 2019